The Funeral And Allied Industries Union Of New South Wales (F&AI) was a trade union in Australia. In 2018 it amalgamated with the Australian Workers Union (AWU). It was affiliated with the Australian Council of Trade Unions.

External links

 A&FI at the ACTU.

Trade unions in New South Wales